Body Love is the seventh album by Klaus Schulze. It was originally released in 1977, and in 2005 was the ninth Schulze album reissued by Revisited Records. It is the original soundtrack for the porn movie of the same name by Lasse Braun.

Track listing
All tracks composed by Klaus Schulze.

Personnel
 Klaus Schulze – electronics
 Harald Grosskopf – drums

External links
 Body Love at the official site of Klaus Schulze
 
  (content alert)

Klaus Schulze albums
1977 soundtrack albums
Film soundtracks
Electronica soundtracks